The Luceafărul gas field is a natural gas field located on the continental shelf of the Black Sea. It was discovered in 2013 and developed by Sterling Resources. It will begin production in 2018 and will produce natural gas and condensates. The total proven reserves of the Luceafărul gas field are around 104 billion cubic feet (3 km³), and production is slated to be around 50 million cubic feet/day (1.4×106m³) in 2018.

References

Black Sea energy

Natural gas fields in Romania